Miss America 1994 was the 67th Miss America pageant, and was held on Saturday, September 18, 1993.

Results

Placements

Order of announcements

Top 10

Top 5

Awards

Preliminary awards

Non-finalist awards

Quality of Life awards

Judges
 Dick Cavett
 Suzanne de Passe
 Pierre Cossette
 Phyllis George
 Ann Moore
 Kim Alexis
 Joan Van Ark

Candidates

External links
 Miss America 1994

1994
1993 in the United States
1994 beauty pageants
1993 in New Jersey
September 1993 events in the United States
Events in Atlantic City, New Jersey